Dr. Anton Vilsmeier (12 June 1894 – 12 February 1962) was a German chemist who together with Albrecht Haack discovered the Vilsmeier-Haack reaction.

Early life
Anton Vilsmeier was born to the mill owner, Wolfgang Vilsmeier, and his wife, Philomena, in Burgweinting, Oberpfalz. He attended the Volksschule and the Altes Gymnasium in Regensburg. During World War I, he served in the 11th Bavarian Infantry Regiment, and became a British prisoner following the Battle of the Somme, returning to Germany in November 1919. From 1920, he studied chemistry at the University of Munich, and from 1922 at the University of Erlangen, where he continued as an assistant after his studies.

Career
Vilsmeier discovered the aldehyde synthesis reaction which bears his name in 1926, and it was published in 1927, the year that he began to work for BASF in Ludwigshafen. He retired in 1959, and died in 1962 in Ludwigshafen.

References
  

1894 births
1962 deaths
20th-century German chemists
Scientists from Regensburg
Ludwig Maximilian University of Munich alumni
University of Erlangen-Nuremberg alumni
Academic staff of the University of Erlangen-Nuremberg
German Army personnel of World War I
German prisoners of war in World War I
World War I prisoners of war held by the United Kingdom